The 1979 Singaporean by-elections were held on 10 February, with the nomination day held on 31 January. With 80,075 registered voters, the 1979 by-elections remain the largest by-election to have ever taken place in Singapore. 

For the by-election in Anson SMC, PAP candidate Devan Nair defeated DPP candidate Johnny Wee Lai Deng with 86.2% of the vote. Devan Nair was elected as the Member of Parliament for Anson SMC.

For the by-election in Mountbatten SMC, PAP candidate Eugene Yap Giau Cheng defeated DPP candidate Seow Khee Leng with 79.9% of the vote. Eugene Yap Giau Cheng was elected as the Member of Parliament for Mountbatten SMC.

For the by-election in Potong Pasir SMC, PAP candidate Howe Yoon Chong defeated independent candidate Chiam See Tong with 66.8% of the vote. Howe Yoon Chong was elected as the Member of Parliament for Potong Pasir SMC.

For the by-election in Sembawang SMC, PAP candidate Tony Tan defeated United People's Front candidate Harbans Singh with 78.4% of the vote. Tony Tan was elected as the Member of Parliament for Sembawang SMC.

For the by-election in Telok Blangah SMC, PAP candidate Rohan bin Kamis defeated WP candidate J. B. Jeyaretnam with 61.2% of the vote. Rohan bin Kamis was elected as the Member of Parliament for Telok Blangah SMC.

For the by-election in Nee Soon SMC, PAP candidate Koh Lip Lin was elected as the Member of Parliament for Nee Soon SMC after an uncontested walkover.

For the by-election in Geylang West SMC, incumbent PAP candidate Teh Cheang Wan was elected as the Member of Parliament for Geylang West SMC after an uncontested walkover.

Background
Similar to 1970 by election, as part of the People's Action Party continuous initiative to renew its ranks, the PAP had invited six instead of five veteran PAP Ministers and Members of Parliament (MPs) to resign. Also, with the demise of Anson's MP P. Govindaswamy, the 1979 by-election is regarded as the biggest-ever by-election in Singapore's history where there are seven seats namely Anson, Geylang West, Mountbatten, Nee Soon, Potong Pasir, Sembawang and Telok Blangah up for grabs. This by-election also sees the introduction of two prominent candidates: the first was Tony Tan Keng Yam, who would be assumed the role of the Cabinet Minister after the by-election victory in Sembawang, and later went on to become the 7th Deputy Prime Minister from 1995, and the 7th President of Singapore from 2011; the second was Chiam See Tong, who made his debut on Potong Pasir would later be elected for that area on his third attempt in the 1984 General elections with his second attempt made on the next year's general election.

Since this is the biggest ever by election in Singapore's history, therefore key opposition stalwarts emerged to contest with the exception of Barisan Sosialis which was then criticised by United People's Front (Singapore) and left the only two constituencies out of seven, namely Nee Soon and Geylang West to be uncontested.

Election deposit
The election deposit was set at $1200. Similar to previous elections, the election deposit will be forfeited if the particular candidate had failed to secure at least 12.5% or one-eighth of the votes.

Results

References
Background of 1979 By election
Results of 1979 By election

1979
Singapore
By-elections
Singaporean by-elections